X server may refer to:

 a display server for the X Window System
 X.Org Server, the X.Org Foundation's display server for the X Window System
 HPE Integrity Superdome X Server, A line of HPE Integrity Servers